The Central Ontario Hockey League  (COHL) was a highly competitive Intermediate ice hockey league in the central Grey County area of Ontario, Canada until the late 1970s.  The league was originally sanctioned by the Ontario Hockey Association, but later the Western Ontario Athletic Association incorporated it into their WOAA Senior Hockey League.

History
The COHL was a Southwestern Ontario Intermediate level league.  All Intermediate was merged with Senior in 1986, but this league was merged into the WOAA Intermediate Hockey League in 1980.  The WOAA now exists as a Senior "AA" hockey league.

The league was fed new players by the local Central Junior C Hockey League, under that name from 1960 until 1980, is now known as the Western Junior C Hockey League.  The league was supported by the local Northern Junior D Hockey League, which folded in 1985.

Their 1976-77 season was very competitive.  The top team in the league was Dromore, followed by Badjeros, Dundalk, Priceville, El-Ron, Flesherton, and Markdale.  The next year, they were joined by the Shelburne Muskies.  They jumped to the Ontario Hockey Association Senior ranks in 1980, and the rest of the league was absorbed by the WOAA.  They stayed under their name as a division of the WOAA until 1982, when they were fully integrated into the league.

Former Member Teams

Badjeros
Barhead Blues
Chatsworth
Creemore Chiefs
Dundalk Flyers
Durham Flyers
Dromore
El-Ron Inn
Feversham
Flesherton Saints
Glenelg
Honeywood
Markdale Majors
Meaford
Priceville
Rocklyn
Shelburne Muskies
Thornbury
Williamsford

Champions
1982 Shelburne Muskies
1981 Honeywood
1980 Dundalk Flyers
1979 Dundalk Flyers
1978
1976
1975
1974
1973
1972 Shelburne Muskies
1971

External links
WOAA Homepage

Defunct ice hockey leagues in Ontario